, known professionally as , is a Japanese actress. She played the lead role in Spider-Man (1978-1979), Battle Fever J (1979-1980), and Toki o Kakeru Shōjo (1985).

Biography 
Miura was born in Iwaizumi, Iwate and moved to Saitama Prefecture as a child. Her older sister, Mayumi Miura, is also an actress. She graduated from Tokyo Metropolitan Yoyogi High School.

Miura earned money as a child model, and made her debut in television commercials advertising Kirin Lemon, a soft drink, in 1974, as the product's fourth image girl. Her first lead role was in Sachiko no Shiawase. Since then, Miura has appeared eight times as a guest star on the jidaigeki Mito Kōmon, more than any other woman. Other jidaigeki appearances include Tōyama no Kin-san, two versions of the Hissatsu series, Shadow Warriors and -IV, the live-action show Sabu to Ichi Torimono Hikae, Abarenbō Shōgun, and Ōoka Echizen.

She has also had roles in modern and fantasy drama including G-Men '75 and '82, the lead actress in the tokusatsu version of Spider-Man, Battle Fever J, and the 1985 television show Toki o Kakeru Shōjo. A celebrity, Miura has appeared on variety and travel programs too. In addition to film and television, she has acted on stage.

Miura is married to actor Daijirō Tsutsumi, who regularly portrays the shōgun Tokugawa Tsunayoshi on Mito Kōmon.

Sources
This article incorporates material translated from 三浦リカ (Miura Rika) in the Japanese Wikipedia, retrieved on August 8, 2008.

References

External links
三浦リカ　プロフィール Miura Rika Profile at the Hipstar agency
DVD  スパイダーマン 東映TVシリーズ DVD-BOX 特集 (Toei Company page with cast lists for Spider-Man films)

1958 births
Japanese actresses
Living people
People from Iwate Prefecture